Shahar Pe'er was the defending champion, but chose not to participate that year.Alla Kudryavtseva won in the final, 6–4, 6–4, against Elena Vesnina.

Seeds

Main draw

Finals

Top half

Bottom half

References
 Main Draw
 Qualifying Draw

2010 WTA Tour
2010 Tashkent Open